The term Commando mortar refers to a class of lightweight infantry mortars designed for maximum portability and rapid deployment with a caliber of 60mm (2.4 in) or less in diameter, at the expense of accuracy and repeatability. Earliest models had been introduced from the 1930s onwards.

Commando mortars often feature design simplifications such as straps instead of bipods, carrying handles, and limited aiming equipment. Some of these straps are marked with measurements, with the intent that the mortarman step on a marked point of the sling and pull it taut, at which point the mortar will be angled so as to fire to the range marked at that point of the sling.

Users
: Type 10 and Type 89 grenade discharger 50mm, second world war.
: "Spade Mortar" 37mm, second world war.
: Hirtenberger M6C-210 Commando Mortar 60mm
: Denel Land Systems M-1 60mm commando mortar
: Denel LS "patrol mortar" or M-4 Commando Mortar 60mm
: DIO "Marsh mortar" 37mm
: L9A1 51 mm Light Mortar
: Lance-grenade individuel Mle F1 (LGI Mle F1) 51mm mortier léger
: INDEP M/968 60mm
: M70 Mortar 60mm
: BA-100 60 mm Mortar.
: MA-9 60 mm Mortar.
: Soltam C03 Mortar 60mm
: DIO HADID 60 mm HM12 and HM13 Commando mortars
: ECIA Mortar 60mm
: DC-M37C1 60mm Patrol Mortar
: MKEK 60mm Commando Mortar
: M6C-640, light mortar 60mm
: Royal Thai Army Ordnance 60mm Mortar WPC A3 (Commando)
: STC Delta GNM-60 mkudro 60mm
: LRM vz. 99 ANTOS 60mm mortar

Sources
Jane's Infantry Weapons — Weblink to older 2002 reference issue.

References

C